Lal Salaam is a 2002 Bollywood musical action drama film starring Nandita Das, Sharad Kapoor and Sayaji Shinde. The film is directed by Gagan Vihari Borate and released on 3 May 2002.

Plot 
This film revolves with the life of Rupi and Kanna, a childhood couple. Rupi realises that village tribes are the main victims of police brutality and the government is unresponsive, unreachable. It make the poor people armed rebels. Kanna is an intelligent and educated student studying MBBS. He believes in non-violence.

Cast
 Nandita Das as Rupi
 Sharad Kapoor as Kanna
 Makrand Deshpande as Rajayya
 Vijay Raaz as Ghisu
 Rajpal Yadav as Dhattu
 Akhilendra Mishra as Rathod
 Sayaji Shinde as Inspector G.C. Deshpande
 Vishwajeet Pradhan as Police Inspector
 Anant Jog
  Hemangini as Mainee
 Susheel Johari
 Prithvi Singh

Soundtrack
All songs are written by Gulzar.

References

External links
 
 Lal salaam in Rotten Tomatoes

2002 films
2000s Hindi-language films
Films about Naxalism
Indian action drama films
2002 action drama films
Films scored by Hridaynath Mangeshkar
Films scored by Uday Mazumdar